Scryptic Studios (or simply, Scryptic) is a website created by a group of comic book writers as a massive resource for comic book writers to network, research stories, read news and columns, and find script samples.  The etymology of the title, Scryptic (pronounced skrip-tik), is the combination of the words SCRIPT (for writing) and CRYPTIC (for secret); so the title literally translates to: SECRET WRITING.

Scryptic was created in June 2004 by five writers, Jeffery Stevenson, Jim Keplinger (ShadowHawk, Genie), Kevin Melrose, Dan Taylor, and led by Ryan Scott Ottney (The Legend of Isis, Bikini Bandits).  Other contributors to the site have included Drew Melbourne (ArchEnemies), Neil Kleid, Brant Fowler, and many others.

In October 2005, Scryptic Studios announced a deal with Write Brothers, Inc in which Scryptic would officially endorse and support Write Brothers' products, and in exchange Write Brothers would promote Scryptic as their official comic book resource. This deal was a direct move on the part of Write Brothers to move their scriptwriting computer software, Movie Magic Screenwriter, into the comic book industry to take the lead over its competitor software, Final Draft.

In the May 2006 issue of Writer's Digest Magazine, Scryptic Studios was named one of the "101 Best Websites for Writers".

Scryptic Studios has continuously been endorsed by writers of all types, from aspiring writers to respected fan-favorite comic book writers such as Geoff Johns (The Flash, Green Lantern, et al.), Brian Augustyn (Batman: Gotham by Gaslight), and many others.

Scryptic Studios has since been shut down; the URL auto-forwards to Ryan Ottney's blog  (September 2009).

References

External links
 ScrypticStudios.com
 Write Brothers, Inc.
 Writer's Digest 2006 101 Best Websites for Writers

Internet properties established in 2004